Yuriy Nuzhnenko (Юрій Нужненко, born June 2, 1976) is a Ukrainian boxer who captured the vacant WBA Interim Welterweight belt on December 8, 2007 in Le Cannet, France against Frédéric Klose of France by twelve-round unanimous decision.

Amateur career
Amateur record: 190–67
1995 and 1996 Ukraine national amateur champion as a Light Welterweight (63,5 kg)
2001 and 2002 most improved boxer in Ukraine
One of the most outstanding boxer who live in Europe
He defeated some of the big names in amateur level like Mark Dungca and Jonell Matias 
Won the Championship fight against Cristopher Sazon of Pandaqaqui via TKO

External links
 

Living people
Welterweight boxers
World welterweight boxing champions
1976 births
Ukrainian male boxers
World Boxing Association champions
Sportspeople from Kyiv